Parachalciope trigonometrica is a moth of the family Noctuidae first described by George Hampson in 1913. It is found in the Gambia and Kenya.

References

Catocalinae
Moths of Africa
Moths described in 1913